Lorenz Oldenberg (2 January 1863, in Berlin – 24 May 1931, in Berlin) was a German entomologist who specialised in Diptera.

Lorenz Oldenberg was an official at the Patent Office.

Works
partial list
Oldenberg, L., 1910, Vier neue paläarktische Akalypteren (Dipt.), Deutsche Entomologische Zeitschrift,1910: 284-287.
Oldenberg, L. 1914 Beitrag zur Kenntnis der europaischen Drosophiliden (Dipt.). Arch. Naturgesch. (A) 80(2):1-42.
Oldenberg, L., 1928, Zwei neue Agathomyia-Arten (Dipt.), Konowia, 7: 311-313.

References
Collin, J. E. 1932: [Oldenberg, L.] Entomologist's Monthly Magazine (3) 68 : 17.
Lichtwardt, B. 1931: [Oldenberg, L.] Konowia'' Wien 10 : 155-156 Nachruf 

German entomologists
Dipterists
1863 births
1931 deaths